Harvey railway station may refer to:

Harvey station (British Columbia), Canada
Harvey station (Illinois), United States
Harvey railway station, Western Australia

See also
Harvey, New Brunswick, Canada, also called Harvey Station